Nguyễn Hữu Dũng (born 28 August 1995) is a Vietnamese footballer who plays as a central midfielder for V-League club Thanh Hóa

Honours

Club
Đông Á Thanh Hóa
Vietnamese National Cup:
 Third place : 2022

International
Vietnam U23
 Third place : Southeast Asian Games: 2015

References

1995 births
Living people
Vietnamese footballers
Association football midfielders
Thanh Hóa FC players
Can Tho FC players
V.League 1 players
People from Thanh Hóa province
Vietnam international footballers
Southeast Asian Games bronze medalists for Vietnam
Southeast Asian Games medalists in football
Competitors at the 2015 Southeast Asian Games